"Give Peace a Chance" is the seventh episode of the sixth season of the American television medical drama Grey's Anatomy, and the show's 109th episode overall. Written by Peter Nowalk and directed by Chandra Wilson, the episode was originally broadcast on the American Broadcasting Company (ABC) in the United States on October 29, 2009. Grey's Anatomy centers on a group of young doctors in training. In this episode, Dr. Derek Shepherd (Patrick Dempsey) performs an operation on a hospital technician's "inoperable" tumor, despite the objections of the chief of surgery, Dr. Richard Webber (James Pickens, Jr.).

The episode was designed to revolve around Dempsey's character. Katherine Heigl (Dr. Izzie Stevens) was absent from the episode, as she was filming the 2010 romantic comedy Life as We Know It. Mark Saul, Jesse Williams, and Nora Zehetner returned as guest stars, while Faran Tahir made his only appearance. "Give Peace a Chance" won Wilson an NAACP Image Award, and received positive reviews from critics, with Tahir's character receiving particular praise. The initial episode broadcast was ranked #4 for the night with 13.74 million viewers, and a 5.2/13 Nielsen rating/share in the 18–49 demographic.

Plot
"Give Peace a Chance" opens with Seattle Grace Mercy West Hospital's chief of surgery, Dr. Richard Webber (James Pickens, Jr.) implementing a new computerized surgical scheduling system, which is disliked by many of the hospital's staff. Thereafter, Isaac (Faran Tahir), a hospital lab technician, brings Dr. Derek Shepherd (Patrick Dempsey) a scan of his tumor, which has been declared inoperable by several other physicians due to its complexity. Isaac asks Shepherd to remove it. Shepherd agrees, but Webber refuses permission for the procedure because of the high risk involved. Shepherd ignores the chief's directions and schedules the surgery. The interns and residents all want the chance to assist due to the rarity of such a tumor, so Shepherd hosts a competition in which the winner gets to join him in the operating room. After seeing Dr. Steve Mostow (Mark Saul) make a mistake, Dr. Cristina Yang (Sandra Oh) is confident that she will win the competition, but loses to Dr. Jackson Avery (Jesse Williams). Dr. Lexie Grey (Chyler Leigh) is not invited to compete because Shepherd wants her to be his caregiver in what would be a long surgery. Knowing that she will not be able to use the bathroom for the entire procedure, Lexie decides to wear a diaper into the operating room; her courage and dedication impresses Yang.

Dr. Izzie Stevens (Katherine Heigl) is scheduled for an interleukin 2 (IL-2) treatment but is absent from the hospital. Dr. Alex Karev (Justin Chambers) calls her, but she does not answer or come, so Karev cries to fellow resident Dr. Reed Adamson (Nora Zehetner). Shepherd spends ten hours in the operating room contemplating what to do about the tumor, with the motivational support of fellow surgeons Dr. Mark Sloan (Eric Dane), Dr. Miranda Bailey (Chandra Wilson), and Dr. Callie Torres (Sara Ramirez). Webber orders Shepherd to end the surgery because he is wasting hospital resources. Shortly thereafter, Isaac awakens to Shepherd explaining that the surgery would not have been possible without paralyzing him. Isaac convinces Shepherd to operate again in secret the next day, and the latter maps out a diagram of the surgery on his bedroom wall while discussing it with his wife Dr. Meredith Grey (Ellen Pompeo), who is home on bed rest after donating part of her liver to her father in the episode "Tainted Obligation". Backed by his fellow attendings, Shepherd obtains Webber's permission to cut the cord but tells Avery and Lexie that they were not cutting the cord and playing by ear instead. He removes all but a tiny section of the tumor. Webber discovers that Shepherd is operating and is about to put an end to it, but Dr. Arizona Robbins (Jessica Capshaw) tells him to go away. Shepherd has to cut a nerve to remove the rest of the tumor, but does not know which will result in paralysis. He decides with a game of "Eeny, meeny, miny, moe", ultimately cutting the correct nerve and eliminating the entirety of the tumor. Despite the successful surgery, Webber is enraged and verbally fires Shepherd. Shepherd dismisses this in a light tone and goes home to drink champagne with his wife.

Production

Running for 43 minutes, the episode was written by Peter Nowalk and directed by Wilson; the latter portrays Bailey. Jenny Barak edited the music and Donald Lee Harris served as the production designer. Heigl was absent from the episode, as she was filming the romantic comedy Life as We Know It (2010). The song featured in the episode was Bat for Lashes' "Moon And Moon", featured on their second album Two Suns. Saul, Zehetner, and Williams returned to the episode as Mostow, Adamson, and Avery, respectively, while Tahir made his first and only appearance as Isaac. The scenes in the operating room were filmed at the Prospect Studios in Los Feliz, Los Angeles; Nowalk said the scenes were difficult to shoot, due to the technicality involved. Pompeo's appearances in the episode were scarce, as she was eight-and-a-half months pregnant during shooting.

According to Nowalk, the idea to have Lexie wear a diaper to get through the operation was inspired by an episode of The Oprah Winfrey Show. He added: "It wasn't that big of a leap for us to go diaper. Our doctors are hardcore by nature." Nowalk said that this episode was primarily focused around Shepherd, which he considered an "experiment". He commented that the idea of Isaac's storyline came from Dr. Robert Bray, a neurosurgeon in Los Angeles. Nowalk intended the nature of the episode to be "different", attributing it to the fact that Heigl's character was absent. He also praised Wilson for directing the episode, commenting that "she acts, she sings, and now she directs". The majority of the episode involved Shepherd staring at his patient's tumor, contemplating what to do. Nowalk offered his insight on this:

Reception
"Give Peace a Chance" was originally broadcast on October 29, 2009 in the United States on the American Broadcasting Company (ABC). The episode underperformed the previous installment, "I Saw What I Saw", in terms of viewership. It was viewed by a total of 13.74 million people, down 1.66 percent from the previous episode, which garnered 15.04 million viewers. In terms of viewership, "Give Peace a Chance" ranked #4 for the night, behind Game 2 of the 2009 World Series, and CBS's CSI and The Mentalist. The installment did not rank high for viewership, but its 5.2/13 Nielsen rating ranked second in its 9:00 Eastern time-slot and the entire night for both the rating and share percentages of the 18–49 demographic, losing to the 2009 World Series but beating CSI, The Mentalist, and Private Practice. Although its rating was in the top rankings for the night, it was a decrease from the previous episode, which garnered a 5.6/14 rating/share in the 18–49 demographic.

Critics were positive in their reviews of the episode. The Huffington Post Michael Pascua called "Give Peace a Chance" a "hit-and-miss" episode, criticizing the slang dialogue by saying it "sounded like it came from a MTV drama", but praising the instalment's "character-driven development". Pascua was positive on the development of Tahir's character, writing: "I hope he comes back in a later episode just to remind these people about patience and hope." TV Fanatic Steve Marsi gave a positive review of the episode, saying it "won [him] over", and also praising Tahir's character. Marsi applauded the development of Dempsey's character, calling him "the best [doctor]", and noted that Wilson's directing may "net her an Emmy nomination".

Writing for Entertainment Weekly, Jennifer Armstrong had mixed feedback on the episode, writing: "The all-medical, all-the-time episodes need to stop." However, she found it "fantastic" when Shepherd drew on the wall, and enjoyed Tahir's character, calling him "lovely". Armstrong also said that "Give Peace A Chance" was in "ER territory", adding: "I do not watch Grey's Anatomy to get my ER fix." Adam Bryant of TV Guide enjoyed this episode compared to the previous one, but disliked the possible romantic development between Karev and Adamson. In his review, he concluded that the instalment "proves that Meredith Grey doesn't have to do all the heavy lifting on this show all the time."

People Carrie Bell enjoyed the episode, praising the balance of cast members. She called Isaac "beloved", and found that the teamwork in the episode proved "there's no 'I' in a team". Former Star-Ledger editor Alan Sepinwall gave a positive review of the entry, applauding the shift in themes and Shepherd's character development. Writing for BuddyTV, Glenn Diaz found the episode comical, calling the scene in which Robbins stands up to Webber "hilarious", and naming Yang the instalment's "comic-relief". Referring to Shepherd and Webber's constant arguments, an AfterEllen senior editor said: "Seriously, these two need to drop their pants and get it over with." Peter Nowalk's writing of the episode was nominated for a Humanitas Prize in the 60 Minute Category. The episode also earned Wilson an NAACP Image Award under the Outstanding Directing in a Dramatic Series category.

References

External links

 "Give Peace a Chance" at ABC.com
 

2009 American television episodes
Grey's Anatomy (season 6) episodes